Kemal Kayhan (born 2 January 1983) is a Turkish volleyball player. He is 200 cm and plays as middle blocker. He plays for Fenerbahçe Grundig and wears number 6. He also played for Çankaya Belediyesi (2000–06), Polis Akademisi (2006–07) and Halkbank Ankara (2007–09).

He capped 60 times for national.

Sporting achievements

Clubs

CEV Challenge Cup
 2013/2014  2013/2014 – with Fenerbahçe Istanbul

National championships
 2010/2011  Turkish Championship, with Fenerbahçe Istanbul
 2011/2012  Turkish SuperCup 2011, with Fenerbahçe Istanbul
 2011/2012  Turkish Cup, with Fenerbahçe Istanbul
 2011/2012  Turkish Championship, with Fenerbahçe Istanbul
 2015/2016  Turkish SuperCup 2015, with Halkbank Ankara
 2015/2016  Turkish Championship, with Halkbank Ankara

Individually
 2010 Turkish League - Best Blocker

References

External links
 Player profile at fenerbahce.org

1983 births
Living people
Turkish men's volleyball players
Fenerbahçe volleyballers
Halkbank volleyball players